Iredale is a rural locality in the Lockyer Valley Region, Queensland, Australia.

Geography 
Lockyer Creek forms the north-eastern boundary. Monkey Water Holes Creek forms the northern boundary before joining the Lockyer. Soda Spring Creek rises in the south and flows through to join the Lockyer in the north-east.

The Warrego Highway passes to the north.

History 
Helidon Scrub Provisional School opened circa 1894. On 1 January 1909, it became Helidon Scrub State School. Circa 1944, it was renamed Iredale State School. It closed in 1975. It was at 646 Spa Water Road.

References 

Lockyer Valley Region
Localities in Queensland